The 2006 Memorial Cup was held in Moncton, New Brunswick, from May 19–28. It was the 88th annual Memorial Cup competition and determined the major junior ice hockey champion of the Canadian Hockey League (CHL). The host team Moncton Wildcats were the only team guaranteed a spot in the tournament. The other teams were the champions of the Ontario Hockey League (OHL), the Peterborough Petes; the Western Hockey League (WHL) champions, the Vancouver Giants; and the Quebec Major Junior Hockey League (QMJHL)'s Quebec Remparts, who were runners-up in the QMJHL final to the champion Wildcats. The Remparts won the Memorial Cup, defeating the Wildcats 6–2 in the first all-QMJHL final in tournament history. It also marked the first time in Memorial Cup history that the winning team was neither the host nor a league champion.

Round-robin standings

Rosters

Schedule

Round robin

Playoff round

Tie breaker

Semi-final

Championship game

Leading scorers

Leading goaltenders

Award winners
Stafford Smythe Memorial Trophy (MVP): Alexander Radulov, Quebec
George Parsons Trophy (Sportsmanship): Jerome Samson, Moncton
Hap Emms Memorial Trophy (Goaltender): Cedrick Desjardins, Quebec
Ed Chynoweth Trophy (Leading Scorer): Gilbert Brule, Vancouver

All-star team
Goal: Cedrick Desjardins, Quebec
Defence: Paul Albers, Vancouver; Michal Sersen, Quebec
Forwards: Alexander Radulov, Québec; Gilbert Brule, Vancouver; Adam Pineault, Moncton

The road to the cup
All series are best-of-seven

WHL playoffs
For regular season final standings and other stats, see 2005–06 WHL season.

OHL playoffs
For regular season final standings and other stats, see 2005–06 OHL season.

QMJHL playoffs
For regular season final standings and other stats, see 2005–06 QMJHL season.

Note: teams cross over between conferences for the final four.

References

External links
 Memorial Cup 
 Canadian Hockey League

Memorial Cup 2006
Memorial Cup tournaments
Memorial Cup 2006
Memorial Cup 2006